Ophonus krueperi is a species of ground beetle in the subfamily Harpalinae, genus Ophonus, and subgenus Ophonus (Brachyophonus).

References

krueperi
Beetles described in 1904